Robert Val Stewart (5 March 1939 – 2 December 2015) was an Australian rules footballer who played with North Melbourne in the Victorian Football League (VFL).

Notes

External links 

2015 deaths
1939 births
Australian rules footballers from Victoria (Australia)
North Melbourne Football Club players
Redan Football Club players